1974 Emperor's Cup Final was the 54th final of the Emperor's Cup competition. The final was played at National Stadium in Tokyo on January 1, 1975. Yanmar Diesel won the championship.

Overview
Yanmar Diesel won their 3rd title, by defeating Eidai Industries 2–1.

Match details

See also
1974 Emperor's Cup

References

Emperor's Cup
1974 in Japanese football
Cerezo Osaka matches